Alexander Jallow (born 3 March 1998) is a Swedish professional footballer who plays for Italian  club Brescia as a right back.

Club career
On 26 August 2022, Jallow signed with Brescia in Italy.

International career
In December 2021, he was selected for the Swedish national team's January tour, which was to be played in Portugal. The tour was later cancelled.

Personal life
Born in Sweden, Jallow is of Gambian descent.

References

External links 
 

1998 births
Swedish people of Gambian descent
Living people
Association football defenders
Swedish footballers
IK Brage players
Jönköpings Södra IF players
IFK Göteborg players
Brescia Calcio players
Ettan Fotboll players
Allsvenskan players
Superettan players
Swedish expatriate footballers
Expatriate footballers in Italy
Swedish expatriate sportspeople in Italy